Amodra is a small village of Una Taluka of Gir Somnath District in Gujarat. Amodra's Population is around 5000 people. In Amodra village the predominant population is of the Karadia Rajput clan and schedule caste people's  Most of the population of Amodra village are farmers and some are businessmen. The land of Amodra is very fertile and the main crops of the village are groundnuts, sugarcane and cotton. The distance between Amodra and Una is around 6 km. Amodra is Birthplace of Great Saint Muldas. Rajabapa Mori was a person who was founder of Sugar Factory Una appreciated and acknowledged by Indira Gandhi during her era. Lakhabapa Solanki after that was Sarpanch and Chairman of Sugar Factory too for 10 years claiming Rajiv Gandhi National Award from Gujarat along with founder of Amul Dr Varghese Kurein. Currently AJITBHAI Mori is Sarpanch of Amodra village since 2021. He has developed sreet light, solid waste management, water management etc. in the village immensely.

The village is full of ritual temples having religious belief. In chaitra (April) month there is 4 Sunday festival, and all faithful people from various surrounding villages come to Amodra and go to various temples, like RANDAL MAA, SHITALA Maa, Khodiyar Maa Chamunda Maa etc.

See also 
 Gujarat 
 Gujarati people
 Gujarati language

References

External links 
 List of villages in Una Taluka [Junagadh District Panchayat]

Villages in Junagadh district